The Way I Am is the 30th studio album by American country musician Merle Haggard, released in 1980.

Background
In 1979, Haggard joined Charlie Daniels and Ernest Tubb on a remake of Tubb's "Walking the Floor Over You," which became a minor hit that fall, and on The Way I Am Haggard pays further tribute to the Texas legend by covering three more of his songs: "Take Me Back and Try Me One More Time," "I'll Always Be Glad to Take You Back," and "It's Been So Long, Darlin'." It also features a rendition of Floyd Tillman's classic statement of romantic fatalism, "It Makes No Difference Now."  The LP's hit single was the Sonny Throckmorton-penned title track, which reached #2 on the Billboard country singles chart. Haggard, who wrote nearly all of his previous album Serving 190 Proof,  provides only four original compositions here, with David Cantwell commenting in his 2013 Haggard biography The Running Kind, "Merle's songwriting ran hot and cold during his MCA tenure, but his vocals were always nuanced and hauntingly melodic..." The album was produced by Haggard's longtime manager Fuzzy Owen, fellow country star Porter Wagoner, and Don Gant, who had also worked with Haggard's hero Lefty Frizzell.

After recording this album, Haggard would score his first #1 hit since 1976's "Cherokee Maiden"  with "Bar Room Buddies," a duet he recorded with actor Clint Eastwood for the soundtrack to the film Any Which Way You Can.

Reception

The LP was released in April 1980 and peaked at number 16 on the Billboard country album charts.

AllMusic critic Stephen Thomas Erlewine describes The Way I Am as "pretty much a straight-ahead honky tonk album that pays little mind to the contemporary trends of the day. Where it differs from Serving 190 Proof or Back to the Barrooms is that the performances are a little inconsistent, as is the material." Music critic Robert Christgau wrote "... Haggard's chief value has been vocal ever since "Okie From Muskogee" saddled him with an image, and here his resonant, reflective baritone transforms three Ernest Tubb tunes from standards into timeless pieces of Americana."

Track listing
All tracks composed by Merle Haggard; except where indicated
 "The Way I Am" (Sonny Throckmorton) – 2:56
 "Sky-Bo" – 3:32
 "No One to Sing For (But the Band)" – 3:34
 "(Remember Me) I'm the One Who Loves You" (Stuart Hamblen) – 3:00
 "Life's Just Not the Way It Used to Be" – 2:53
 "Wake Up" – 4:06
 "Where Have You Been" (Leona Williams) – 2:50
 "Take Me Back and Try Me One More Time" (Ernest Tubb) – 2:51
 "I'll Always Be Glad to Take You Back" (Ernest Tubb) – 3:19
 "It Makes No Difference Now" (Jimmie Davis, Floyd Tillman) – 3:08
 "It's Been So Long, Darlin'" (Ernest Tubb) – 3:01

Personnel
Merle Haggard – vocals, guitar

Production notes
Produced by Porter Wagoner, Don Gant, Fuzzy Owen
Engineered by Russ Bracher

Chart performance

References

1980 albums
Merle Haggard albums
Albums produced by Don Gant
MCA Records albums